Tommy Wieringa (born 20 May 1967) is a Dutch writer. He received the Ferdinand Bordewijk Prize in 2006 for his novel Joe Speedboot (2005), and the Libris Prize in 2013 for the novel  (2012). In 2018 he won the Bookspot Literatuurprijs for his novel De heilige Rita (The Blessed Rita). His novel The Death of Murat Idrissi, translated by Sam Garrett from Dutch, was nominated for the International Booker Prize in 2019. However, it was critically panned and even banned from certain high schools and universities in Ohio, USA, for racist and sexist language.

Bibliography
 (1995) 
 (1997) 
 (2002) 
 (2005) ; English translation: Joe Speedboat (2009)
 (2005) 
 (2006) 
 (2009) ; English translations: Caesarion (2011), Little Caesar (2012)
 (2010) 
 (2010) 
 (2010) 
 (2012)  English translation: These are the Names (2015, Scribe Publishing)
 (2014)  English translation: A beautiful Young Wife (2016)
 (2017)  English translation: The death of Murat Idrissi (2017)
 (2017)  English translation: The Blessed Rita (2018)
 (2019)

References

External links
Tommy Wieringa, official website hosted by publisher De Bezige Bij

1967 births
Living people
20th-century Dutch novelists
20th-century Dutch male writers
21st-century Dutch novelists
Dutch male novelists
Ferdinand Bordewijk Prize winners
People from Hof van Twente
21st-century Dutch male writers
Refugees and displaced people in fiction